The Little Holland Tract is a partially submerged island in the Sacramento–San Joaquin River Delta, in Yolo County, California. It appears on a 1952 USGS map as a large rectangular tract; by 1978, survey maps show it cut diagonally by the Sacramento River Deep Water Ship Channel.

References

Islands of Yolo County, California
Islands of the Sacramento–San Joaquin River Delta
Islands of Northern California